The position of Resident-Superior of Annam (French: Résident supérieur de l'Annam; Vietnamese: Khâm sứ Trung Kỳ; Hán tự: 欽使中圻) was established on 8 April 1886 as a successor to the Resident-General of Annam and Tonkin (résident général de l'Annam et du Tonkin) when it was decided to have one French resident for the French protectorate of Annam and a separate one for Tonkin. Although the Emperors of the Nguyễn dynasty were still nominally in control of the protectorates of Annam and Tonkin, the Resident-Superior of Annam gradually gained more influence over the imperial court in Huế. In 1897 the Resident-Superior was granted the power to appoint the Nguyễn dynasty Emperors and presided over the meetings of the Viện cơ mật. These moves incorporated French officials directly into the administrative structure of the Imperial Huế Court and further legitimised French rule in the legislative branch of the Nguyễn government. From this period onwards any imperial edicts issued by the Emperors of Đại Nam had to be confirmed by the Resident-Suoerior of Annam giving him both legislative and executive power over the Nguyễn government.

In the year 1898 the federal government of French Indochina took over the financial and property management duties of the Nguyễn dynasty's imperial court meaning that the Nguyễn dynasty Emperor (at the time Thành Thái) became a salaried employee of the Indochinese colonial structure, reducing their power to being only a civil servant of the Protectorate government. The Resident-Superior of Annam also took over the management of provincial mandarins and was a member of the Supreme Council (Conseil supérieur) of the Government-General of French Indochina.

List  

List of administrators of the French protectorate of Annam

(Dates in italics indicate de facto continuation of office)

See also 

 History of Vietnam
 Annam (French protectorate)
 French colonial empire

References

External links
World Statesmen – Annam (Vietnam)

Vietnam history-related lists
Annam
France–Vietnam relations